Cacodyl oxide is a chemical compound of the formula [(CH3)2As]2O.  This organoarsenic compound is primarily of historical significance since it is sometimes considered to be the first organometallic compound synthesized in relatively pure form. 

"Cadet's fuming liquid", which is composed of cacodyl and cacodyl oxide, was originally synthesized by heating potassium acetate with arsenic trioxide.  It has a disagreeable odor and is toxic. 

The molecular structure of [Ph2As]2O (Ph = phenyl), the tetraphenyl analogue of cacodyl oxide, has been established by X-ray crystallography.

See also
 Arsenic
 Arsine
 Cacodylic acid
 Lewisite
 Cacodyl cyanide

References

Cacodyl compounds
Foul-smelling chemicals